The 2013 Dominion All-Star Curling Skins Game was held from January 19 to 20 at the Casino Rama Entertainment Centre in Rama, Ontario. The total purse for the event was CAD$100,000.

Competition format
As in previous years, four teams will play two semifinals games, and the winners of the semifinals games will meet in the final to determine the winner. However, the teams will be chosen by fan voting and by random draw, similar to All-Star games in other sports. The top ten teams in the Canadian Curling Association's rankings system in the previous year are nominated, and the top four fan voting selections for each position (skip, third, second, lead) will play in the competition. The skips will each randomly draw their third, second, and lead from the top four selections, and the four All-Star teams will compete against each other.

Teams
The teams will be determined by a random draw in Toronto on January 17. The players that will compete are listed as follows, ordered by number of votes earned:

Roster
The teams are listed in draft order by skip. Skips selected their teammates in a snake order, and were not allowed to choose their own teammates unless necessary.

A donation was made to the Sandra Schmirler Foundation on behalf of Pat Simmons, who was selected last among the players.

Results
Jeff Stoughton, who had last pick in the draft, was given the choice of picking his opponent in the semifinal, and Stoughton chose to play Team Kevin Koe in the first semifinal.

All draw times are listed in Eastern Standard Time (UTC−5).

Semifinals

Team Stoughton vs. Team Koe
Saturday, January 19, 1:00 pm

Team Martin vs. Team Howard
Saturday, January 19, 9:00 pm

Final

Team Koe vs. Team Howard
Sunday, January 20, 1:00 pm

Final winnings
The final prize winnings for each team are listed below:

Notes

References

External links

2013
The Dominion All-Star Curling Skins Game
The Dominion All-Star Curling Skins Game, 2013
2013 in Ontario